Athiabari is a census village in Baksa district, Assam, India. As per the 2011 Census of India, Athiabari has a total population of 4,234 people including 2,141 males and 2,093 females.

References 

Assam